Janez Ramoveš (born 21 September 1965) is a Slovene poet and musician. In 2012 he received the Jenko Award for his collection of poetry written in the Poljane dialect, Skuz okn strejlam kurente (I Shoot at Kurents Through the Window).

Published works

 Božjastnice, (1990)
 Striptiz. Namesto Kim Basinger, (1995)
 Poročilo iz geta, (2001)
 Moja velika debela mama, (2001)
 Staroselski ciklus, (2006)
 Čreda, (2010)
 Skuz okn strejlam kurente, (2012)

References

Slovenian poets
Slovenian male poets
Living people
1965 births
People from the Municipality of Gorenja Vas-Poljane